Močerady is a municipality and village in Domažlice District in the Plzeň Region of the Czech Republic. It has about 60 inhabitants.

Administrative parts
The village of Nové Dvory is an administrative part of Močerady.

References

Villages in Domažlice District